Poppy Corbett (born 1986) is a playwright, director and teacher of creative writing. She studied at Royal Holloway, University of London, the Central School of Speech and Drama and the Royal Court Young Writers Programme.

Her play Hatchling won Masterclass's inaugural Pitch Your Play competition and was given a reading on the Theatre Royal Haymarket's main stage.  She is the author of numerous short plays, including a pantomime Robin Hood for Bigfoot Arts Education.

She is the co-author of The Enormous Book of Talk for Writing Games (London: Philip and Tacey, 2013), a creative writing resource book for teachers.  She is a founder of the playwriting company Agent 160 (patron: Timberlake Wertenbaker). 
She is represented by Nick Quinn at The Agency.

She is the daughter of the poet and educationalist Pie Corbett.

References

1986 births
Living people